A. A. N. M. & V. V. R. S. R. Polytechnic is a polytechnic located in Gudlavalleru village, Krishna District, Andhra Pradesh, India.  It is affiliated to the Andhra Pradesh State Board of Technical Education and Training, Hyderabad.  The polytechnic is approved by the All India Council for Technical Education.

History
The polytechnic was established in 1981 by the late Adusumilli Aswardha Narayana Murthy and Valluripalli Venkata Rama Seshadri Rao, via the AANM & VVRSR Educational Society, who also established Gudlavalleru Engineering College in Gudlavalleru in 1998.  Ch. Venkatramanna was the principal for almost 20 years.

References

External links
 

Engineering colleges in Andhra Pradesh
Universities and colleges in Krishna district
Educational institutions established in 1981
1981 establishments in Andhra Pradesh